Cervimunida princeps is a species of squat lobster in the family Munididae. It is found in the East China Sea and off Japan, Taiwan, and northern Luzon.

References

Squat lobsters
Crustaceans described in 1902